Samuel Frost Haviland Born Peekskill, New York 22 December 1798, the eldest son of John Downing Haviland 1769 - 1829 by his marriage to Anna Wright Frost 1776 - 1851. Died Santiago, Chile 13 December 1858. 

He was appointed 26 February 1820 First lieutenant, 3rd artillery regiment, New York State.  Shortly afterwards he emigrated to Chile, arriving first at Valparaiso March 1822. In Chile he is credited with having established the first bank in that country, and in March 1839 he was appointed US Consul General at Coquimbo. Married Puerto de Huaso, Chile 19 August 1825 Maria Feliza Ossandón e Irriberren (born Chile 20 November 1803, died Santiago, Chile 26 February 1893).   11 recorded children.

Chilean businesspeople
1798 births
1858 deaths
United States Army officers